The 2002–03 Wake Forest Demon Deacons men's basketball team represented Wake Forest University as a member of the Atlantic Coast Conference during the 2002–03 NCAA Division I men's basketball season. Led by head coach Skip Prosser, the team played their home games at Lawrence Joel Veterans Memorial Coliseum in Winston-Salem, North Carolina. The Demon Deacons won the ACC regular season title by two games over Maryland, but would lose in the semifinals of the ACC Tournament. Wake Forest received an at-large bid to the NCAA tournament as the No. 2 seed in the East region. After a 3-point win over East Tennessee State in the opening round, the Deacons were upset by No. 10 seed Auburn in the second round to end the season with a record of 25–6 (13–3 ACC).

Roster

Schedule and results

|-
!colspan=9 style=| Regular Season

|-
!colspan=9 style=| ACC Tournament

|-
!colspan=9 style=| NCAA Tournament

Rankings

References

Wake Forest Demon Deacons men's basketball seasons
Wake Forest
Wake Forest